The Nimmo Brothers are a Scottish blues rock band.

History 
The Nimmo Brothers was founded in 1995 by the brothers Stevie and Alan Nimmo (both of whom play guitar and sing) in Glasgow. Previously, they were in a group called the Blackwater Blues Band, which released one album. Over time, the Nimmo brothers have had several accompanying musicians.

The Nimmo Brothers recorded their first album  Moving On  (1998) in Glasgow. Their subsequent albums have all been recorded for Armadillo Music. Their first album for Armadillo, recorded in 2001, was Coming Your Way.

Since 2009, Alan Nimmo performs with his band King King. His older brother Stevie plays with the Stevie Nimmo Trio. But both brothers also continue to perform as The Nimmo Brothers.

In 2015, The Nimmo Brothers toured the UK for the 20th anniversary of their band. In 2015 and 2016, they received British Blues Awards as best blues band.

Discography 
 1998: Moving On
 2001: Coming Your Way
 2003: New Moon Over Memphis
 2004: Live Cottiers Theatre
 2009: Picking Up the Pieces
 2012: Brother to Brother

Notes

References

External links 
 The Nimmo Brothers at Armadillo Music
 The Nimmo Brothers at Allmusic
 The Nimmo Brothers at Discogs

British blues rock musical groups
Musical groups from Glasgow